Elsham railway station is a former railway station in Elsham, Lincolnshire, England. The station was opened by the Trent, Ancholme and Grimsby Railway on 1 October 1866 and like other T. A. & G. stations had staggered platforms. The station was the most easterly of the T. A. & G. stations the line, situated just a few miles from Wrawby Junction, Barnetby where it joined the M. S. & L. R. towards Grimsby. It was formally closed by British Rail on 3 October 1993.

The final station master was Mr Robert Christopher Swinton, retired in 1966. Joint SM with Appleby Lincolnshire.

References

Disused railway stations in the Borough of North Lincolnshire
Railway stations in Great Britain opened in 1866
Railway stations in Great Britain closed in 1993
Former Great Central Railway stations